Carlos Biggeri (1908–1965) was an Argentine mathematician who won several prestigious awards including the Association of Culture of Argentina, the Faculty of Science of Madrid (Spain) and the Institution Mitre

1908 births
1965 deaths
20th-century Argentine mathematicians